Adrian Barber (13 November 1938 - 8 August 2020 in Ilkley, Bradford, West Yorkshire, England) was a musician/producer who is most noted for recording the Beatles Live! at the Star-Club in Hamburg, Germany; 1962, producing the Allman Brothers Band's self-titled debut album, along with the Velvet Underground's album Loaded. He died due to Covid 19, spending the rest of his life on the island of Hawaii.

Musician / electronics
Barber was the lead guitarist in Liverpool's quartet "Cass and the Casanovas" (led by Brian "Cass" Cassar) and its subsequent Big Three. Also an electronic wizard, he was responsible for upgrading the group amps (called "coffins") but also upgrading other Liverpudlian's gear. This included Paul McCartney's quad amp. He left the Big Three in mid-1962, when the band planned to be a quartet.

Sound stage manager
In 1962, due to his knowledge in the electronic field, Barber was hired by Horst Fascher to improve the Star-Club's Sound system. In late December 1962, he recorded bands performing and some of his tapes were released as Live! at the Star-Club in Hamburg, Germany; 1962.

Producer / sound engineer 
In the late 1960s, Barber became a recording engineer/producer for Atlantic Records, for instance on
 1969 Cream - Goodbye
 1969 The Allman Brothers Band
 1967 Aretha Franklin - I Never Loved a Man the Way I Love You
 1968 Aretha Franklin - Aretha Now
 1969 Velvet Underground - Loaded (also drumming on 2 tracks)
 1969 The Rascals - Freedom Suite
 1969 The Rascals - See
 1968 Buffalo Springfield - Last Time Around
 1969 Bee Gees - Odessa
 1969 Aretha Franklin - Lady Soul
 1971 Aretha Franklin - Aretha's Greatest Hits
 1973 Aerosmith - Aerosmith

References
 

Living people
1938 births
People from Ilkley
Musicians from Bradford
English record producers
English male guitarists
Beat musicians
The Big Three (English band) members